The Journal of Linguistics is a triannual peer-reviewed academic journal covering all branches of theoretical linguistics and the official publication of the Linguistics Association of Great Britain. It is published by Cambridge University Press and is edited by Kersti Börjars, Helen de Hoop, Adam Ledgeway and Marc van Oostendorp.

History
The journal was established in 1965 and Sir John Lyons was its first editor (1965-1969). From 1969 until 1979, Frank R. Palmer was the editor-in-chief. Other past editors include Nigel Fabb (University of Strathclyde), Caroline Heycock (University of Edinburgh), and Robert D. Borsley (University of Essex). Current editors are Kersti Börjars (University of Manchester), S.J. Hannahs (Newcastle University), Helen de Hoop (Radboud University Nijmegen) and Hans van de Koot (University College London).

External links 
 

Linguistics journals
Publications established in 1965
English-language journals
Cambridge University Press academic journals
Triannual journals